A list of roads in Kazakhstan.

Systems 
Please note that the codes are in Latin, and thus, transliteration is not required (for example writing "P" as "R").
The highways of general government ("Republican") Significance are divided into three groups whose names differ by a code letter:
 М – international highways; their names and kilometer was retained by the road network of the Soviet Union
 A – Highways military strategy between the main administrative, cultural and economic centers of Kazakhstan and neighboring countries as well as roads significance
 P – other (regional) roads of national importance

There also are highways of Regional significance. Each region's highways get their own specific codes. Please note that the codes are in Latin, and thus, transliteration is not required.

 Abai Region, East Kazakhstan Region: KF, and the list of highways can be seen from this link (Archive)
 Akmola Region: KC, and the list of highways can be seen from this link (Archive)
 Aktobe Region: KD, and the list of highways can be seen from this link (Archive)
 Almaty Region, Jetisu Region: KB, and the list of highways can be seen from this link (Archive)
 Atyrau Region: KE, and the list of highways can be seen from this link (Archive)
 Jambyl Region: KH, and the list of highways can be seen from this link (Archive)
 Karaganda Region, Ulytau Region: KM, and the list of highways can be seen from this link (Archive)
 Kostanay Region: KP, and the list of highways can be seen from this link (Archive)
 Kyzylorda Region: KN, and the list of highways can be seen from this link (Archive)
 Mangystau Region: KR, and the list of highways can be seen from this link (Archive)
 North Kazakhstan Region: KT, and the list of highways can be seen from this link (Archive)
 Pavlodar Region: KS, and the list of highways can be seen from this link (Archive)
 Turkistan Region: KX, and the list of highways can be seen from this link (Archive)
 West Kazakhstan Region: KL', and the list of highways can be seen from this link (Archive)

International highways

National Highways

Regional Highways

License plate Code

References

See also
Full List from 2021 (in Russia) https://adilet.zan.kz/rus/docs/V2100024613 (Archive)